The 12037/38 New Delhi–Ludhiana Shatabdi Express was a Superfast Express train of the Shatabdi Express category belonging to Indian Railways – Northern Railway zone that ran between New Delhi and Ludhiana in India.

Coaches

The 12037/38 New Delhi–Ludhiana Shatabdi Express had 1 AC First Class, 10 AC Chair Car & 2 End-on Generator coaches. It did not carry a pantry car but being a Shatabdi category train, catering was arranged on board the train.

As was customary with most train services in India, coach composition may be amended at the discretion of Indian Railways depending on demand.

Service

The 12037 New Delhi Ludhiana Shatabdi Express covered the distance of 329 kilometers in 05 hours 25 mins (62.67 km/hr) and in 05 hours 30 mins as 12038 Ludhiana New Delhi Shatabdi Express (62.07 km/hr).

As the average speed of the train was above , as per Indian Railway rules, its fare included a Superfast surcharge.

Rake sharing

The 12037 / 38 New Delhi–Ludhiana Shatabdi Express shared its rake with 12043 / 44 New Delhi–Moga Shatabdi Express.

Routeing

Being a Shatabdi-class train, it returned to its originating station New Delhi at the end of the day.

Loco link

As the route was yet to be electrified, a Tughlakabad-based WDP-3A powered the train for its entire journey.

Timings

12037 New Delhi–Ludhiana Shatabdi Express used to leave New Delhi every day except Monday & Saturday at 07:00 hrs IST and reach Ludhiana Junction at 12:25 hrs IST the same day.
12038 Ludhiana–New Delhi Shatabdi Express used to leave Ludhiana Junction every day except Monday & Saturday at 16:40 hrs IST and reach New Delhi at 22:10 hrs IST the same day.

References

External links

Shatabdi Express trains
Rail transport in Delhi
Rail transport in Punjab, India
Rail transport in Haryana
Transport in Delhi
Transport in Ludhiana
Defunct trains in India